Riverview Park was an amusement park in Chicago, Illinois, which operated from 1904 to 1967. It was located in the Roscoe Village neighborhood of Chicago's North Center community area.

Founding 
Riverview was established in 1904 by William Schmidt, on the grounds of his private skeet shooting range. The Schmidt family owned and operated the park throughout its lifetime.

"Big Bill" Haywood, the Industrial Workers of the World leader, once spoke here to a crowd of almost 80,000 people.

Rides and attractions 
Riverview was most known for The Bobs wooden roller coaster.  Other popular coasters were The Comet, The Silver Flash, The Fireball and the Jetstream.  Aladdin's Castle was a classic fun house with a collapsing stairway, mazes and turning barrel. Shoot the Chutes, Hades, the Rotor, Tilt-a-Whirl, Wild Mouse, the Mill on the Floss (Tunnel of Love), and Flying Turns were just a few of the many classic rides.  "The Pair-O-Chutes at Riverview Park'll shake us up all day" is a line from the Beach Boys' song "Amusement Parks U.S.A." from their 1965 album, Summer Days (And Summer Nights!!). There were over 120 rides in the park.

Racism and closing
Riverview closed in 1967. Urban myths endure, describing the park's "seedy" atmosphere in the 1960s, as it coincidentally became more integrated. Contemporaneous articles in black publications, such as the Chicago Defender, described black patrons being subject to both latent and overt racism; the most overt being a longstanding attraction named "Dunk the Nigger", later renamed "African Dip", which the NAACP successfully lobbied to shut down in the 1950s. In 1966, when Martin Luther King visited Chicago, Mayor Richard J. Daley shut the park for several days, believing it would become a site of racial unrest.

According to Victoria Wolcott, author of 2012 book Race, Riots, and Roller Coasters

Chuck Wlodarczyk, author of Riverview Gone But Not Forgotten, once performed shows about the park and reported people often approached him afterwards to report hearsay of someone raped in the park restrooms by a black man, however no actual record of these crimes exist. A Chicago Tribune article from late 1967 also blames violence for the park's closure, however Wolcott says there is little evidence of increased violence at the park.

Ultimately, white flight contributed to financial declines at the park, making the land upon which Riverview was built far more valuable than the park itself. The Schmidt family sold to developers and later stated a newspaper's reported estimated sale price of $6.8 million ($ in ) was too low.

The former grounds are now home to Riverview Plaza shopping center, the Chicago Police Area 3 Detective Division, DePaul College Prep High School, dental equipment manufacturer Hu-Friedy Manufacturing, and Richard Clark Park, part of the Chicago Park District.  The south end of Clark Park has a wooded area where many of the Riverview Park foundations are still visible and is currently used as a bicycle dirt jump and pump track park maintained by the Chicago Area Mountain Bikers.  A sculpture entitled Riverview by local artist Jerry Peart stands in front of the police station.

Memorabilia 
Many items from Riverview, as well as many paintings portraying the park, were on display at Riverview Tavern, located on the corner of West Roscoe Street and Damen Avenue from 2005 to 2018. The Riverview Carousel continues to operate at Six Flags Over Georgia. It was the only ride to be saved.

Bally and Williams tie-ins  
The 1972, Bally Manufacturing Corporation pinball machine Fireball was named after the park's Fireball roller coaster. Also, Bally's Aladdin's Castle amusement arcade division was renamed from Carousel Time to honor the closed Riverview Park and the Aladdin's Castle funhouse. Bally's Aladdin's Castle pinball machine was also inspired by the same funhouse at Riverview. The 1979 Williams Electronics' pinball game Flash as well as their 1985 Comet was named after the park's roller coasters with these names. Bally Manufacturing Corporation and Williams Electronics, Inc. had their headquarters and primary manufacturing facilities just west of Riverview Park during the later years of the park's operating life.

List of Rides

See also
Flying Cars, former ride

References

Further reading

External links 

 
 Sharpshooters Productions Inc.'s Riverview Park site
 Dolores Haugh Riverview Amusement Park Collection at Newberry Library
 Sanborn map of Riverview Park, 1913

1904 establishments in Illinois
1967 disestablishments in Illinois
Amusement parks in Illinois
Defunct amusement parks in the United States
Demolished buildings and structures in Chicago
Former buildings and structures in Chicago
Tourist attractions in Chicago